Ghost is a studio album by Matt Elliott, released under the moniker The Third Eye Foundation. It was originally released on Domino Recording Company in 1997.

Critical reception
Keith Farley of AllMusic gave the album 3 stars out of 5, saying, "A focus on warped guitar noise and the odd, untraceable samples place Ghost in similar territory to earlier Third Eye material, though 'Corpses as Bedmates' and 'The Star's Gone Out' reveal a few interesting drum'n'bass patterns." Peter Margasak of Chicago Reader said, "Elliot channels in dense, often harsh, slate-gray soundscapes that frequently rumble with hyperactive rhythm programming."<ref> Mike Goldsmith of NME gave the album 7 stars out of 10, saying "Uncomfortable bedfellows for sure, and hardly easy listening, but apparently that's the idea. Whether these are meditations on the past or (somewhat more worryingly) visions of the future, 'Ghost' remains deliciously spooky stuff and the precursor of hopefully stranger things to come. Enter at your peril".

Track listing

References

External links
 

1997 albums
Matt Elliott (musician) albums
Domino Recording Company albums
Merge Records albums